"A series of tubes" is a phrase used originally as an analogy by then-United States Senator Ted Stevens (R-Alaska) to describe the Internet in the context of opposing network neutrality. On June 28, 2006, he used this metaphor to criticize a proposed amendment to a committee bill. The amendment would have prohibited Internet service providers such as AT&T, Comcast, Time Warner Cable and Verizon Communications from charging fees to give some companies' data a higher priority in relation to other traffic. The metaphor has been widely ridiculed, particularly because Stevens displayed an extremely limited understanding of the Internet, despite his leading the Senate committee responsible for regulating it.

Partial text of Stevens's comments

Media commentary 
On June 28, 2006, Public Knowledge government affairs manager Alex Curtis wrote a brief blog entry introducing the senator's speech and posted an MP3 recording. The next day, the Wired magazine blog 27B Stroke 6 featured a lengthier post by Ryan Singel, which included Singel's transcriptions of some parts of Stevens's speech considered the most humorous. Within days, thousands of other blogs and message boards posted the story.

Most writers and commentators derisively cited several of Stevens's misunderstandings of Internet technology, arguing that the speech showed that he had formed a strong opinion on a topic which he understood poorly (e.g., referring to an e-mail message as "an Internet," and blaming bandwidth issues for an e-mail problem much more likely to be caused by mail server or routing issues). The story sparked mainstream media attention, including a mention in The New York Times. The technology podcast This Week in Tech also discussed the incident.

According to The Wall Street Journal, as summarized by MediaPost commentator Ross Fadner, "'The Internet is a Series of Tubes!' spawned a new slogan that became a rallying cry for Net neutrality advocates. ... Stevens's overly simplistic description of the Web's infrastructure made it easy for pro-neutrality activists to label the other side as old and out-of-touch." Several parodies of Stevens's speech have been created, usually consisting of samples taken from this speech with an added melody.

Edward Felten, Princeton University professor of computer science, pointed out the unfairness of some criticisms of Stevens's wording, while maintaining that the underlying arguments were rather weak.

In popular culture 
The Daily Show with Jon Stewart made multiple references to "Techno" Ted Stevens's "series of tubes" description; as a result, Stevens has become well known as the person who once headed the committee charged with regulating the Internet. "I have a letter from a big scientist who said I was absolutely right in using the word 'tubes'," Stevens said to reporters in response to The Daily Shows coverage. When asked if he would think about going on the show to debate Jon Stewart, Stevens replied, "I'd consider it."

Google has included references to this in two of its products. Gears's about box once read "the gears that power the tubes" and Google Chrome had an about: Easter egg at the address about:internets which displayed a screensaver of tubes (if Windows XP's SSPIPES.SCR is installed) with the page title "Don't Clog the Tubes!" When "about:internets" was entered on a computer lacking that screensaver, the tab displayed a gray screen with the page title "The Tubes are Clogged!" This Easter egg was removed as of the 2.0.159.1 release. The documentation for developing Chrome extensions includes a near-verbatim quote of the "series of tubes" paragraph when describing its chrome.storage class.

YouTuber Pyrocynical had a running series on his channel named "A Series of Tubes" (ASOT), the theme song of which is a remix of Stevens' words. The said remix song dates back from 2006 and was created by a user of the name manish on the YTMND website, where it garnered tremendous popularity.

Tribute 
Alexandra Petri of The Washington Post wrote a humorous article entitled "Sen. Stevens, the tubes salute you" after Stevens died in an airplane crash August 9, 2010:
And as people remember him, make ill-timed jests, and muse on his legacy—all in real time, in great profusion—I worry that they are disrupting the ability of people elsewhere to receive their Internets. But for us in the Facebook generation who weren't around for the first plane crash and know the Bridge to Nowhere primarily as an SNL punchline, the senator's legacy is in that series of tubes.

See also 

 Congestive collapse
 Fairness measure
 Information superhighway
 Network congestion avoidance

References

External links 

This WEEK in TECH podcast talking about net neutrality and the series of tubes
"Recommended: Tubes: A Journey to the Center of the Internet" (by Andrew Blum) by Anna Kuchment and Michael Moyer, Scientific American, June 1, 2012

American political catchphrases
American political neologisms
Internet access
Internet memes
Internet terminology
Net neutrality
2006 speeches